The 1st "Golani" Brigade is an Israeli military infantry brigade that is subordinated to the 36th Division and traditionally associated with the Northern Command. It is one of the five infantry brigades of the regular Israel Defense Forces (IDF) (the others being the Paratroopers Brigade, the Nahal Brigade, the Givati Brigade and the Kfir Brigade). Its symbol is a green olive tree against a yellow background, with its soldiers wearing a brown beret. It is one of the most highly decorated infantry units in the IDF. The brigade consists of five battalions, including two which it kept from its inception (12th and 13th), one transferred from the Givati Brigade (51st).

The brigade was formed on February 22, 1948, during the 1948 Arab–Israeli War, when the Levanoni Brigade in the Galilee split into the 1st Golani Brigade and the 2nd Carmeli Brigade. It has since participated in all of Israel's major wars and nearly all major operations, including the Suez Crisis, the Six-Day War, the War of Attrition, the Yom Kippur War, Operation Entebbe, the 1978 South Lebanon conflict, the 1982 and 2006 Lebanon Wars, and various operations during the Palestinian intifadas.

Three of its commanders, Mordechai Gur, Gabi Ashkenazi and Gadi Eizenkot have become IDF Chiefs of Staff with many more reaching the rank of aluf (major general).

History

Founding and initial organization
As the end of the British Mandate of Palestine was fast approaching, the leadership of the Haganah drafted Plan Dalet for its subsequent organization and operations. The plan divided the fighting militia (Field Corps) into six regional brigades – Levanoni in the north, Alexandroni in the Sharon region, Kiryati in the Tel Aviv area, Givati in the Shfela, and Etzioni in the Jerusalem area. On February 28, 1948, the Levanoni Brigade was split into two—Carmeli in the northwest, and Golani in the northeast.

Golani's area of operations included much of the Lower Galilee and Jezreel Valley, the Jordan Valley and the Hula Valley. It extended to al-Jalama and Bat Shlomo in the west. Major population centers included Safed, Tiberias, Beit She'an and Nazareth. The new brigade included five battalions, with its headquarters in Yavne'el:

War of Independence

During the 1947–48 Civil War in Mandatory Palestine, Golani mostly participated in the battles for the mixed cities in the north, such as the Battle of Tiberias and battles in Safed in April–May 1948. The 12th Battalion captured al-Shajara on May 6, 1948, and the 13th captured Beit She'an on May 12. After these operations, responsibility over the northeastern part of the brigade's sector (the Tel Hai area, 11th Battalion), was handed over to the Oded Brigade and other forces. In December 1948, the 14th and 15th battalions were merged into the Mechanized Attack Battalion.

The first Golani action following the Arab intervention in the 1948 war was the defense of the kibbutzim Degania Alef and Bet from the Syrian Army in the Battles of the Kinarot Valley. Units from the Barak Battalion, with Yiftach (Palmach) and Guard Corps reinforcements, successfully fended off a Syrian attack. The brigade was also successful at repelling Iraqi forces at the Battle of Gesher to the south. After the Jordan Valley battles died out, Golani went on the offensive, attacking a number of Arab villages in its sector, and finally mounting an offensive on Jenin together with the Carmeli Brigade on June 2, 1948. The attack eventually succeeded, but Jenin was retaken by the Iraqi Army shortly after.

During the Battles of the Ten Days between the first and second truces of the war (July 8–18, 1948), Golani managed to repel the Arab Liberation Army attack on Sejera from Lubya, and helped capture Nazareth and eventually Lubya in Operation Dekel. Golani also participated in Operation Hiram in October 1948, where at first it staged diversionary attacks from the south, and afterwards went on to capture Eilabun, Mughar, Rameh and other villages in the ALA First Yarmouk Battalion's zone.

In December 1948, the brigade was largely transferred to the south in preparation for Operation Horev. Golani fought the Egyptians in the Gaza Strip, in Operation Assaf, the Battle of Hill 86 and later battles around Rafah. In March 1949, the brigade was tasked with capturing Umm Rashrash (today Eilat) with the 7th Armored Brigade. Golani advanced through the Arabah region in the east and arrived at the location two hours after the 7th. This was the last operation of the war.

Border Raids and Suez Crisis
After the 1948 Arab–Israeli War, the Golani Brigade participated in a number of reprisal raids in the first part of the 1950s. In 1951, a Syrian patrol entered the demilitarized zone near Tel Mutilla, and was attacked by reservist IDF troops. Golani reinforced a reserve battalion and entered a battle that lasted five days, costing the brigade 40 dead and 72 wounded. The battle caused a number of changes in the IDF doctrine and was a catalyst for the creation of Unit 101. On October 28, 1955, after a border incident with Egypt around the Auja al-Hafir demilitarized zone, Golani was tasked with leading Operation Volcano, an attack on the Egyptian army in the area and the largest military operation at the time since the 1948 war.

In the Suez Crisis of 1956, the brigade's task was to capture the area around the city Rafah. The 51st Battalion, formerly of Givati, led the assault on the Rafah Junction. They were ordered to abandon their vehicles after reaching a minefield and coming under fire from Egyptian artillery, although the battalion's sappers slowly created a way forward for a line of vehicles and the battalion captured the intended Egyptian positions. The 12th Battalion captured positions on the Rafah – Khan Yunis road, and the 13th—positions south of Rafah.

In early 1960, after a border incident on the backdrop of the Israeli–Syrian water dispute, Golani destroyed the abandoned village al-Tawafiq, which overlooked Tel Katzir and was used by the Syrians as a military base. In March 1962, Golani launched Operation Swallow against the Syrians at Nuqeib on the east bank of the Sea of Galilee, in response to constant Syrian harassment of Israeli fishermen in the lake. In May 1965, as part of a larger operation, Golani conducted a raid on Shunat Nimrin in Jordan.

Six-Day War
On June 7, 1967, Golani units joined Israeli armored units in its assault on Nablus, capturing the city by 15:00. The remainder of the brigade was kept in the north for the planned thrust against the Syrian army on the Golan Heights. Planning called for the 12th Battalion to capture Tel Faher and Burj Babil, Banias, Tel Hamra and Ayn Fit. The 51st would take Bahriat, Tel Azaziat and Khirbet as-Suda. The 13th Battalion was left as an operational reserve in the northeastern tip of Israel.

On June 9, the 51st Battalion crossed the border and advanced north along the Syrian patrol road. Its 3rd Company turned west to find Bahriat abandoned, while 2nd Company turned west and flanked Tel Azaziyat. The soldiers drove into a minefield and were forced to abandon their half-tracks, advancing to the trenches of Tel Azaziyat on foot. The battle continued from 16:21 to 17:06, ending in a Syrian surrender. At 16:46, 3rd Company captured Khirbet as-Suda, along with a T-54 tank. Meanwhile, the 12th Battalion split up to assault Burj Babil and Tel Faher. The forces at Tel Faher met stiff resistance and the 2nd Company now in Burj Babil was called to assist them. By 16:20, the southern position at Tel Faher had been taken. At 17:30, the Golani reconnaissance company came from the southeast to reinforce the 12th, and by 18:20, Tel Faher was in Israeli hands.

The 13th Battalion was called to help the 8th Brigade which was operating in the same area. They helped capture a position north of Za'ura, and the village Jbab al-Mis to the south. Just before dawn, the 51st assaulted Banias and captured it, followed by reinforcements from the 45th Brigade that captured Tel Hamra slightly to the north. During the course of the war, the Golani Brigade suffered 59 dead and 160 wounded, of them 23 in the Battle of Tel Faher.

Counter-terror Activities
After the Six-Day War, the activity in northern Israel where Golani was based was mostly limited to raids against fedayeen (guerrilla) bases in Jordan, Lebanon and the West Bank (now under Israeli control). The objectives of these raids was to undermine the fedayeen bases in order to prevent attacks against Israelis. The three main raids against Jordan during this period were: the attack on the village Wadi al-Yabis across the river from Tirat Tzvi; the attack on the Cones Position across from Ashdot Ya'akov; and the attack on the Jordanian Ghor canal and defensive line.

The raid on Wadi al-Yabis, code-named Operation Asuta 12, was carried out by the Golani reconnaissance unit and the 12th Battalion on May 4, 1969. The forces did not meet any resistance and returned after completing the mission of destroying a number of structures. The Cone Position (named after a cone-shaped building on the premises) was attacked by the reconnaissance unit in July 1969. The guerrillas fled, but alerted the Jordanians who opened artillery fire on the Israelis. After blowing up two bunkers, the Israelis returned. The destruction of the Ghor canal was a punitive measure against the Jordanian farmers of the area, from where numerous guerrilla attacks against Israeli farmers were initiated. The three positions defending it did not notice the Israeli forces. While the attack did not go as planned when the bombs laid near the canal were detonated prematurely, it was nevertheless destroyed and the water drained into the Yarmouk River.

On the Lebanese front, Golani participated in numerous raids into southern and eastern Lebanon. In October 1969, the brigade's forces attacked Itarun (Operation Double Bass 1), Tel Sadr al-Arus and 'Arab Zahiran. Twenty-four buildings were destroyed across the three villages. Another operation, Double Bass 10, involved a retaliatory raid on Kfar Kila on January 2, 1970, in response to the kidnapping of an elderly guard from Metula by Fatah two days earlier. Another retaliatory strike came on December 27, 1970, against the village Yatar, a major guerrilla base. A major attack was carried out in response to the 1972 Munich Massacre. On September 16, 1972, Operation Extended Turmoil 4 was launched against bases in southern Lebanon, containing an estimated 600 guerrillas. Golani forces reached the Litani river in the east, while Paratroopers reached Juwaya just south of the river. Most of the guerrilla forces did not engage the Israelis and chose to retreat, although over 40 of them were killed.

In the Gaza Strip, Golani operated according to the new counter-terror IDF doctrine calling for the adoption of guerrilla tactics, and operating in small teams and in open areas. During this period, Golani units were also stationed along the Bar Lev line and participated in the War of Attrition, especially in the Qantara East area.

On the 4th of July 1976 a detachment of Golani took part in Operation Entebbe to rescue hostages held in Uganda by at least six Palestinians and two German terrorists supported by regular Ugandan soldiers. The mission was a resounding success, although there were three hostages killed as well as Lieutenant Colonel Yonatan Netanyahu, the commander of Sayeret Matkal who spearheaded the attack.

Yom Kippur War
Like the rest of the IDF, the Golani Brigade was caught by surprise with the first Arab attack of the Yom Kippur War. The brigade's sector in the Golan Heights was lightly manned, and most of its units were either on leave or preparing for a planned major ceremony. The Syrians attacked in three major locations: near Khushniya, Quneitra and Mas'ada. The 13th Battalion's position on Mount Hermon was overrun on October 6–7, 1973. The brigade was assigned defence of the northern Golan, in preparation for a push to retake the Hermon.
 
After helping fend off two major Syrian offensives, armored forces joined the battle in the area and gave Golani time to reorganize. A northern and southern force were created, with the southern force taking and defending major positions in the heart of the Golan, including Nafakh, a military base and junction on the Petroleum Road. The Petroleum Road crosses diagonally the northern Golan Heights and the Nafakh base is at the junction with a road which leads down to the strategic Bnot Yaakov Bridge over the Jordan River and into northern Israel. By October 10, those parts of the Golan under the brigade's responsibility were back under Israeli control, and the Syrians were pushed back over the Purple Line. However, the 12th Battalion commander was killed in the battle for Mount Varda. The Israelis went to the offensive in the northern Golan on October 11. The 12th Battalion captured Jubata al-Khashab and Tel al-Ahmad, and later took positions and fended off Syrian attacks in Mazra'at Beit Jan. The 51st took Tel ad-Dahur, and after a failed attack on Beit Jann, took the village Hadar.

After the events of October 6, Israel was determined to recapture Mount Hermon, nicknamed the "eyes of the country". The Second Battle of Mount Hermon commenced on October 8, when the 17th Battalion took tanks and half-tracks up the slopes of the Hermon, but its attack failed and the battalion suffered 25 dead and 57 wounded. During the next 13 days, the Israelis exchanged artillery fire with the Syrians on the Hermon, but the next attack only came on October 21. Operation Dessert saw a joint force of Paratroopers and Golani retake the mountain. Golani staged a three-pronged attack by the 51st Battalion, the reconnaissance unit, the 17th Battalion and a motorized battalion. The reconnaissance unit captured the cable car position at dawn with support from elements of the 17th Battalion that were seconded to the Recce Unit. The battle ended at 11:00, when the 51st Battalion reported that it had captured the Israeli Golan position.

After the Yom Kippur War, Golani forces were involved in a war of attrition with Syria until the disengagement agreement of May 31, 1974. After the agreement was signed, the brigade, which had lost many of its top officers in the war, was transferred into the Sinai to rebuild and train. They were brought back to the Golan Heights in early 1975.

Operations in Southern Lebanon and First Lebanon War
During the 1970s, Golani conducted frequent raids in Southern Lebanon in its battle against terror attacks and guerrilla raids by the Palestinian Fatah organization. In March 1978, with the launch of Operation Litani, much of the brigade moved to capture the village al-Hiyam. The 12th Battalion captured Marjayoun and Rashaya al-Fukhar. After clearing these villages, Golani units returned to Israel and advanced west along the Litani River, capturing a number of villages and stopping at Abbasiya just east of Tyre.

In Operation Peace for Galilee, which later became known as the First Lebanon War, Golani's 51st Battalion fought in the vicinity of Nabatieh, and on June 6, 1982, the reconnaissance unit assaulted the PLO-held Beaufort Castle. The 12th Battalion was subordinated to the Barak Armored Brigade, with a planned thrust along the Lebanese coastal strip to Tyre. This force captured the villages Doha and Kafr Sil on June 9–10, 1982, on the outskirts of Beirut. The brigade also took part in the Siege of Beirut, where its units were present until the end of the war in September 1982.

Second Intifada
Two years after the start of the Second Intifada in 2000, Israel launched Operation Defensive Shield in response to growing Palestinian terrorist attacks against Israeli soldiers and civilians. Golani participated in a number of battles against Palestinian militants, including the siege of the Ramallah Mukataa, capture of Tulkarm, and the Battle of Jenin.

Second Lebanon War and afterwards
In the Second Lebanon War in July 2006, Golani participated in the Battle of Maroun al-Ras and the 12th and 51st battalions fought in the Battle of Bint Jbeil. During the Battle, a hand grenade was thrown over the wall, Major Roi Klein jumped on the live grenade and muffled the explosion with his body. Eight soldiers and commanders from the 51st battalion were killed.

The Golani Brigade also participated in Operation Cast Lead. On January 5, 2009, Golani soldiers Maj. Dagan Wartman (32), Staff Sgt. Nitai Stern (21), and Cpl. Yousef Muadi (19) were killed in northern Gaza in a friendly fire incident when a tank accidentally fired a live round at an abandoned building in Jabalya in which Golani forces were taking cover. Three other soldiers were severely wounded and twenty more had minor injuries.

Following the deployment of Golani soldiers in Hebron in December 2011, the Left wing press has reported that city residents have sensed a 'manifest worsening of soldiers behavior', as a result of 'detention, intimidation, provocation and arrest of children and teenagers; arbitrary detention of Palestinians or blocking access to roads; beating or threatened beating of detained residents; religion-based provocation and insults; forcible entry into homes and violation of Palestinian property' and 'reprisals against local and international human rights activists.'

At 1:05 a.m. on July 20, 2014, during Operation Protective Edge, seven Golani soldiers from the 13th Battalion were killed in the Battle of Shuja'iyya when an M113 armoured personnel carrier they were being transported in caught fire after an explosive device was set off under it. Reportedly, the APC was not fitted with armor that can withstand this type of blast. At 1:30 a.m., a soldier was killed when two soldiers got into a firefight with terrorists. At 5:45 a.m., another Golani force got into a firefight with terrorists. Two soldiers were killed. At 8:50 a.m., three soldiers were killed when a Golani squad was caught inside a burning building, for a total of thirteen Golani soldiers killed in action that morning. The commander of the Golani Brigade, Colonel Ghassan Alian, the first non-Jewish commander of the brigade and the highest ranking Druze in the IDF, was also lightly injured in his eye in an exchange of fire but later returned to his soldiers after being treated.

Insignia

The symbol of the brigade is a green olive tree with its roots on a yellow background. It was drawn by the 12th Battalion's intelligence officer, who came from kibbutz Beit Keshet, home to numerous olive trees. However, other sources claim it's an oak located in Yavne'el. The colors green and yellow symbolize the green hills of the Galilee, where the brigade was stationed at the time of its creation while the olive tree is known for its strong roots that penetrate and firmly hold the land, reflecting the brigade's connection with the State of Israel's heritage. The yellow background on which the tree stands reflects the brigade's role in the south of the country in the war of 1948, when it captured Umm-Rashrash, now Eilat, Israel's southernmost city.

Early Golani soldiers were farmers and new immigrants, so the strong connection to the land (earth) was important to honor. For this reason, Golani's soldiers are designated by brown berets; the brown color symbolizing the brigade's connection with the soil of the Land of Israel.

The Golani Brigade's official song was written by Amos Ettinger, composed by Efi Netzer and popularly performed by Yehoram Gaon. The song mentions the brigade's many battles, including references to Rafah in the Sinai War, Tel Faher in the Six-Day War, and Mount Hermon in the Yom Kippur War.

Namesakes
At the Golani Interchange in the upper Galilee east of Haifa stands the Golani Brigade Museum commemorating the brigade and its fallen troops. The site is also used for battalion ceremonies.

Equipment
Golani Brigade's standard assault rifle is the X95. Other infantry weapons are Negev LMG, FN Mag, M24 SWS and M2 Browning. Rockets and missile include the M72 LAW, RPG-7, Rafael MATADOR, TOW and Spike family.

The Golani Brigade's equipment includes a number of heavy IDF Achzarit armored personnel carriers, which is built around a re-manufactured T-55 tank chassis with a new  engine. The Achzarit is a very heavily armored vehicle designed for the requirements of urban fighting, after Israeli M-113 APCs proved insufficiently armored against car bombs, mines, and rocket-propelled grenades. Today they are replaced by the IDF Namer, advanced heavy APC based on a Merkava chassis. However, as of 2014, the M113 was still seeing combat service as an APC in the brigade.

Units

Commanders of the Golani Brigade

Bibliography

References

External links

 The Official Golani Web Site In Hebrew
 Golani Brigade
 Army seals off Hizbullah stronghold of Bint Jbail

Military units and formations established in 1948
1948 Arab–Israeli War
Brigades of Israel
Northern Command (Israel)
Infantry of Israel